Malibu Creek State Park is a state park of California, United States, preserving the Malibu Creek canyon in the Santa Monica Mountains.  The  park was established in 1974.  Opened to the public in 1976, the park is also a component of Santa Monica Mountains National Recreation Area.

Geography
Malibu Creek State Park stretches from below Malibou Lake in the west to Piuma Road in the east. It follows the creek down to the Pacific Ocean and includes the Adamson House and creek's mouth in the Malibu Lagoon at the beach. Tapia Park has recently been incorporated as a subunit of the park. The park includes three natural preserves:  Liberty Canyon,  Udell Gorge, and  Kaslow Preserve.

History
The land that is now Malibu Creek State Park was inhabited by native Chumash people for millennia. The site of a village called Talepop has been uncovered by archaeologists in the northeast corner of the park. The Chumash were most famous for their redwood canoes, which they used to travel the coastline for hundreds of miles. By the 1860s a few homesteads existed, including the Sepulveda Adobe, which still stands.

In 1900 a group of wealthy Los Angeles businessmen created the Crags Country Club and purchased  along Malibu Creek. In 1903 a  dam was built nearby, creating a  lake which was later purchased by 20th Century Fox and named Century Lake. The three-level,  Crags Club Lodge was completed in 1910. Redwood trees were planted near the lake that same year, and today stand as the southernmost specimens in California. Also within park boundaries is the Rindge Dam in Malibu Canyon, built in 1926. The Crags Country Club ceased operations in 1936 and the lodge was torn down in 1955.

The majority of the park's lands were donated by entertainer Bob Hope.  Other parts of the park, added later, were previously owned by Paramount Pictures and 20th Century Fox for movie ranches. Part of the former 20th Century Fox Ranch had been purchased in 1966 from Ronald Reagan. The Reagan ranch, known as "Yearling Row", was owned by the future president from 1951 to 1966 (Reagan earlier owned another ranch also called Yearling Row in Northridge, California).  It was sold by the Reagans to pay campaign debts from the 1966 California governor's campaign. Additional parcels have been connected by the Santa Monica Mountains Conservancy and Santa Monica Mountains National Recreation Area.

In 2014, adjacent Cameron Nature Preserve in Puerco Canyon was acquired by the Santa Monica Mountains Recreation and Conservation Authority. This created a contiguous block of public parkland from this park to Corral Canyon Park and will provide a path for the Coastal Slope Trail. The  was purchased from Oscar-winning director James Cameron.

In 2018 substantial portions of the park, including the Reagan ranch and the Fox Ranch location for many films and television shows, were burned and destroyed by the Woolsey Fire.

Landmarks

King Gillette Ranch 
Most recently an area was annexed to the park known as the King Gillette Ranch, with a landmark Spanish Colonial Revival style residence and estate buildings designed by renowned architect Wallace Neff in the 1920s for owner King C. Gillette, the early-20th-century inventor and manufacturer of the Gillette disposable razor.  It was later used by the Catholic Claretian Order as Claretville in the 1950s–60s, then by several other spiritual groups, and finally by Soka University in the 1990s until the recent purchase for the park. The new visitor center for the Santa Monica Mountains National Recreation Area is located here in the historic Stables compound.

Sepúlveda Adobe
The Sepúlveda Adobe, a 19th-century ranch house, was built by the Sepúlveda family of California, a prominent Californio family of Southern California, is located within the park.

Films shot at the Fox Ranch 
When owned by 20th Century Fox, the park was known as the Fox Ranch, which was a remote backlot for their movie productions for decades. The park was a key filming location for the film M*A*S*H (1970) and the subsequent television series (1972–83). The landscape was particularly seen in the opening credits for the show as helicopters carrying wounded approach the hospital with the recognizable Goat Buttes in the background.
  
Other television programs that used the park to pass for a post-apocalyptic Earth were Planet of the Apes and the children's program Ark II. This was also a location for Robin Hood: Men in Tights where the Goat Buttes are seen in the background of the final wedding scene. While the park continues to be used for occasional filming, it has been a location in dozens of films, beginning with a number of Tarzan movies:

 Tarzan Escapes (1936), Tarzan's Revenge (1938), Tarzan Finds a Son! (1939)
Blockade (1938)
Full Confession (1939)
How Green Was My Valley (1941)
My Friend Flicka (1943)
Lifeboat  (1944)
Mr. Blandings Builds His Dream House (1948)
Viva Zapata! (1952)
Between Heaven and Hell (1956)
The Defiant Ones (1958) 
The Second Time Around (1961)
Posse from Hell (1961)
The Sand Pebbles (1966) 
Doctor Dolittle (1967)
Planet of the Apes (1968), Beneath the Planet of the Apes (1970), Battle for the Planet of the Apes (1973)
Butch Cassidy and the Sundance Kid (1969)
Tora! Tora! Tora! (1970)  - concreted lake bed on the ranch was filled with water, and a miniature Ford Island and "Battleship Row" were constructed for the Pearl Harbor Attack scenes.
The Poseidon Adventure (1972) - concreted lake bed on the ranch was filled with water, and used for the miniature ship capsizing scenes.
The Towering Inferno (1974) — concreted lake bed drained, and used for foundation of 70-foot tall miniature exteriors of a fictitious skyscraper.
Logan's Run (1976) - exterior shots involving wilderness areas and ancient highways.
Masters of the Universe (1987)
Tour Of Duty (1987–90)
Pleasantville (1998)
The Hunter's Moon (1999)
Secretary (2002)

Activities
Recreation activities in the park include: horseback riding, bird watching, hiking, mountain biking, rock climbing, fishing, and picnicking. Ranger led programs and hikes are also offered.

The Backbone Trail, a multi-use long-distance trail spanning the Santa Monica Mountains, passes through Malibu Creek State Park. Another long distance trail, the Coastal Slope Trail, is under construction and will pass through the remote southern tip of the park.

See also 
List of California state parks

References

External links

Malibu Creek State Park—California State Parks
Malibu Creek State Park—Malibu Creek Docents

State parks of California
Parks in Los Angeles County, California
Santa Monica Mountains National Recreation Area
Movie ranches
Nature centers in California
Protected areas established in 1974
1974 establishments in California
Calabasas, California
Mulholland Highway
Santa Monica Mountains
Tourist attractions in Malibu, California